Altogether Now (Birds Bees Flowers Trees) is a greatest hits compilation and the third release by the English musical group Patrick & Eugene. The album contains tracks from their previous two albums, Postcard from Summerisle and Everything & Everyone, and was their first release in the United States. The penultimate track, "Saturday Night", is exclusive to this compilation, as is "Peony" which is only available on certain versions of the album, such as that purchased from the label's website.

Track listing

References

External links
Official website

2009 compilation albums